Zürich Friesenberg is a railway station in the west of the Swiss city of Zürich, in the city's Friesenberg quarter. The station is on the Uetliberg line, which is operated by the Sihltal Zürich Uetliberg Bahn (SZU).

The station is served by the following passenger trains:

The station has a single track and a single platform, although the line widens into a two track dynamic passing loop on the opposite side of the level crossing on the downhill side of the station. This level crossing is notable as the Uetliberg line, electrified at 1200 V DC, is crossed here by route 32 of the Zürich trolleybus system, electrified at 600 V DC.

References

External links 
 

Friesenberg